Swanpool is a town in north-east Victoria, Australia.

Swan Pool (sic) Post Office opened on 10 May 1877 and closed in 1994.

Swanpool used to have an Australian Rules football team competing in the Ovens and King Football League until being kicked out by AFL Country.

References

External links

Community website

Towns in Victoria (Australia)
Rural City of Benalla